Elena Tagliabue (born 12 December 1977) is an Italian former alpine skier who competed in the 2002 Winter Olympics.

References

1977 births
Living people
Italian female alpine skiers
Olympic alpine skiers of Italy
Alpine skiers at the 2002 Winter Olympics